Andranofito (also Ambohimierambe-Andranofito) is a town and commune in Madagascar. It belongs to the district of Antanifotsy, which is a part of Vakinankaratra Region. The population of the commune was 15,127 in the 2018.

Primary and junior level secondary education are available in town. The majority (99%) of the population of the commune are farmers.  The most important crop is rice, while other important products are sweet granadillas, maize and potatoes.  Services provide employment for 1% of the population.

References

Populated places in Vakinankaratra